Biddulph railway station was a railway station opened by the North Staffordshire Railway in 1864. Originally named Gillow Heath the station was renamed Biddulph on 1 May 1897.

Passenger traffic was withdrawn from the station on 11 July 1927, but freight traffic continued until 5 October 1964.

References

Former North Staffordshire Railway stations
Disused railway stations in Staffordshire
Biddulph